Hurlingham is a suburb of Johannesburg, South Africa. Hurlingham has traditionally been an upmarket residential suburb. This residential suburb is located just outside the Sandton central business district. It is located in Region B of the City of Johannesburg Metropolitan Municipality.

History
The land was proclaimed as a suburb on 25 May 1938 and is named after an English polo-field. The land is situated on a portion of an old Witwatersrand farm called Zandfontein.

References

Johannesburg Region B